A Finntown is a quarter populated by Finnish American people in the cities and big villages of the United States. In the United States there were a dozen Finntowns. In the Finntowns were services for Finnish people, usually at least a co-op store, a church and a town hall. In the biggest Finntowns there were, for example, saunas, restaurants, hotels, shoemakers, tailors, barbers and record stores all serving in Finnish. The biggest communities of Finnish Americans were in Brooklyn, New York (Finntown (Brooklyn)) and in Harlem, in Hancock, Michigan, in Duluth, Minnesota, in Butte, Montana, in Astoria, Oregon, Chicago, Berkeley, California, Ashtabula, Ohio and Cleveland. 

The Finntowns flourished until the 1950s, when they started to vanish. Nowadays the biggest Finnish-American community is in Lake Worth and Lantana in Florida. There 18 000 Finnish residents, both old and new immigrants.

References

Sources
Pitkänen, Silja & Sutinen, Ville-Juhani: Amerikansuomalaisten tarina, Tammi, 2014. ISBN 978-951-31-7568-9.
Turun Sanomat, 5 April in 2006, https://www.ts.fi/teemat/1074112019

Finnish culture
Finnish diaspora
Finnish American
Finnish-American culture